Woodlawn is the name of some places in the U.S. state of Maryland:

Woodlawn, Baltimore County, Maryland
Woodlawn, Cecil County, Maryland
Woodlawn, Prince George's County, Maryland
 Woodlawn (Columbia, Maryland)